{{Infobox television
| alt_name             = McMillan (season 6)
| image                = Mcmillan and wife intro.jpg
| caption              = McMillan & Wife title card marquee
| genre                = Police procedural
| starring             = Rock HudsonSusan Saint James
| theme_music_composer = Jerry Fielding
| country              = United States
| language             = English
| num_seasons          = 6
| num_episodes         = 40
| list_episodes        = List of McMillan & Wife episodes
| producer             = Paul MasonJon Epstein
| executive_producer   = Leonard B. Stern
| runtime              = 90 minutes (seasons 1-2)120 minutes (seasons 3-6)
| company = Talent Associates-Norton SimonUniversal Television
| distributor = NBCUniversal Television Distribution(2004-2011)
| network              = NBC
| first_aired          = 
| last_aired           = 
}}McMillan & Wife (known simply as McMillan from 1976–77) is an American police procedural television series that aired on NBC from September 17, 1971, to April 24, 1977. Starring Rock Hudson and Susan Saint James in the title roles, the series premiered in episodes as part of Universal Television's wheel series NBC Mystery Movie, in rotation with Columbo and McCloud. Initially airing on Wednesday night, the original lineup was shifted to Sundays in the second season, where it aired for the rest of its run.  For the final season, known as McMillan, numerous changes were made that included killing off St. James' character of Sally McMillan.

PlotMcMillan & Wife revolved around Stuart McMillan (Rock Hudson), a 50-ish former criminal defense attorney who becomes San Francisco police commissioner, and his attractive, bright, affable wife Sally (Susan Saint James), who was in her 20s. The episodes often found Mac and Sally attending fashionable parties and charity benefits before solving robberies and murders. John Schuck, as McMillan's likeable, somewhat bumbling aide Sgt. Charles Enright and Nancy Walker as Mildred, the couple's sarcastic, hard-drinking maid, provided comic relief.

Sally is pregnant at the end of season 1, but this is apparently retconned away and is never mentioned in later seasons. She is pregnant again in season 4, and has the baby (a boy) in the final episode of season 4. The baby is not seen or mentioned in season 5.

Cast

Episodes

The show ran for five seasons as McMillan & Wife and a sixth season as McMillan on the NBC television network, from September 17, 1971, to April 24, 1977, for a total of 40 episodes.

Popularity

Like the other two original shows in the NBC Mystery Movie, McMillan & Wife was an immediate hit. After its network run on NBC, it appeared regularly as part of The CBS Late Movie and later, in the form of syndicated reruns on local and cable television in the United States.

On January 1, 2015, McMillan & Wife began airing on MeTV as part of the "MeTV Mystery Movie" late night block. That block included the other two long running Sunday Mystery Movie series, McCloud and Columbo, the Wednesday Mystery Movie series Banacek and the Perry Mason television movies. Each week featured a different series, with the series airing every night during its feature week.

Beginning in 2022, the series airs on Cozi TV as part of a "Columbo & Company" programming block, paired with episodes of  The NBC Mystery Movie programs Columbo, McCloud , Banacek and Quincy, M.E.

Cast and series name change
For its sixth and final season, the series underwent a major retooling. Susan Saint James left after being unable to come to terms on a new contract. Nancy Walker also left the series before the sixth season premiered in 1976 to star in The Nancy Walker Show, a sitcom that was cancelled after 12 episodes.

With these developments, the show became known as McMillan and Sally was killed off in a plane crash along with the couple's never-seen son. Mac, now a widower, moved out of the family home and into a luxury apartment. Mildred, meanwhile, was written out as having left the McMillans to open her own diner on the East Coast, which was an inside joke playing up her role as Rosie the waitress in a then-ongoing series of commercials for Bounty Paper Towels.

John Schuck had his role reduced as he joined the sitcom Holmes and Yo-Yo, on which show director Leonard B. Stern was working. Meanwhile, Sergeant Enright was promoted to Lieutenant and became Deputy Chief of the San Francisco Police, which took him away from his position as Mac's liaison. Martha Raye, who had played Mildred's sister Agatha in an earlier episode, joined the series full-time with Agatha taking over Mildred's role as Mac's housekeeper in his new apartment.  Richard Gilliland joined the cast as Enright's replacement, Sergeant DiMaggio, who always introduced himself by saying "no relation" (in reference to Joe DiMaggio).

Home media
Universal Studios released the first season of McMillan & Wife on DVD in Region 1 & Region 2 in 2005/2006.

On May 21, 2010, Visual Entertainment announced it had acquired the rights to distribute McMillan & Wife on DVD in Region 1.  They subsequently released seasons 2–6 on DVD in Canada and the USA. All US releases are distributed by Millennium Entertainment.

On November 30, 2012, VEI released McMillan & Wife: The Complete Series on DVD in both the US and Canada. This 24-disc set features all 40 episodes of the series as well as bonus copy of The Snoop Sisters Complete Collection.

In Region 4, Madman Entertainment has released all six seasons on DVD in Australia.  On November 20, 2013, it released McMillan and Wife: The Complete Collection'', a 19-disc set featuring all 40 episodes of the series.

Filming locations
The interior set of the McMillans' home in the pilot episode was actually Rock Hudson's house. In the second episode they moved to a new home, exterior shots were done on Greenwich Street in San Francisco. The address for the couple was once given in the show as 250 Trenton Street. In later episodes a different house was used as the exterior shot of the house. In the final season McMillan, newly widowed, moved into an apartment and the house was never seen or mentioned again.

References

External links

McMillan & Wife episode guide

1970s American crime drama television series
1970s American mystery television series
1971 American television series debuts
1977 American television series endings
Fictional married couples
NBC original programming
Television shows set in San Francisco
Television series by Universal Television
NBC Mystery Movie
English-language television shows
American detective television series
Television duos
Television series about marriage